KHPQ is a radio station airing a country music format licensed to Clinton, Arkansas, broadcasting on 92.1 MHz FM.  The station is owned by King-Sullivan Radio.

References

External links
KHPQ's official website

Country radio stations in the United States
HPQ